Étrépagny is a commune in the Eure department in the Normandy region in northern France.

Population

International relations
Since 1989, the town has been twinned with the Irish town of Trim which has a significant Norman heritage.

See also
Communes of the Eure department

References

Communes of Eure